A pressure room may refer to:

 A positive pressure enclosure, which uses positive pressure to remove harmful substances from the enclosure
 A negative pressure room, which uses negative pressure to help prevent harmful substances from escaping the room